The Living Idol is a 1957 film American horror film directed and written by Albert Lewin. The plot is about an archaeologist who believes that a Mexican woman is a reincarnation of an Aztec princess.

Reception
According to MGM records the film earned $125,000 in the US and Canada and $225,000 elsewhere, making a loss to the studio of $339,000.

See also
 List of American films of 1957

References

External links
The Living Idol at TCMDB

1957 films
1957 horror films
CinemaScope films
American horror films
Films directed by Albert Lewin
Films set in Mexico
Metro-Goldwyn-Mayer films
1950s English-language films
1950s American films